The 1985 West of England Championships, also known as the Bristol Open, was a men's tennis tournament played on grass courts that was part of the 1985 Nabisco Grand Prix circuit. It was played at Bristol in Great Britain from 17 to 24 June 1985. The final could not be played on the outdoor grass courts due to persistent rain and was moved to an indoor court at David Lloyds Racket Club in Heston. Marty Davis won the singles final in front of just a handful of spectators and commented "I haven't really played in many finals, and I didn't really care if it had to be switched here or to the Falkand Islands, I was just delighted to win it".

Finals

Singles

 Martin Davis defeated  Glenn Layendecker 4–6, 6–3, 7–5
 It was Davis' 1st singles title of the year and the 3rd of his career.

Doubles

 Eddie Edwards /  Danie Visser defeated  John Alexander /  Russell Simpson 6–4, 7–6
 It was Edwards' 2nd title of the year and the 4th of his career. It was Visser's only title of the year and the 1st of his career.

Notes

References

External links
 ITF tournament edition details

Bristol Open
 
Bristol Open
Bristol Open
1985 in English tennis